Nordman is an unincorporated community in Bonner County, Idaho, United States. Nordman has a post office with ZIP code 83848.

References

Unincorporated communities in Bonner County, Idaho
Unincorporated communities in Idaho